The National Transportation Safety Committee (NTSC, KNKT; literally "Transportation Safety National Committee") is an Indonesian government agency charged with the investigation of air, land, rail, and marine transportation safety deficiencies.

It has its headquarters on the third floor of the Ministry of Transportation Building in Central Jakarta, Jakarta. It was formerly a part of the Ministry of Transportation, before it was set as independent agency directly under the President in 2012. The Aircraft Accident Investigation Commission (AAIC, KPPKPU) investigates aviation accidents and incidents.

The NTSC was established by presidential decree in 1999. Subsequent to its investigations, it makes recommendations that are intended to prevent the recurrence of similar accidents.

The NTSC emphasizes that the sole objective of its activities is to prevent recurrence of accidents, not to assign blame or liability.

In 2000, shortly after its creation, the NTSC issued a report on the crash of SilkAir Flight 185, where 104 people were killed, which stated that the agency was unable to determine a cause. The United States National Transportation Safety Board, which had also assisted in the Flight 185 investigation, told the NTSC that the cause of the crash was a suicide by pilot (in this case the captain) via a letter sent on December 11 the same year.

However, the first aviation accident investigated by the NTSC was Garuda Indonesia Flight 152, where 234 people were killed. This occurred less than three months before the SilkAir crash. The report of Flight 152 was issued in 2004 (having been hampered by the SilkAir crash), which stated that agency determined that the cause of the crash of Flight 152 was pilot error and air traffic control error.

See also

 Directorate General of Civil Aviation (Indonesia)

Notes

External links
 Official website
 Aviation accident reports

Rail accident investigators
Indonesia
Automotive safety
1999 establishments in Indonesia
Transport organizations based in Indonesia
Government agencies of Indonesia